Deadmalls and Nightfalls is the second full-length studio album by Frontier Ruckus, released on July 20, 2010 by Ramseur Records.

Reception

The album received positive reviews. PopMatters stated that the record "not only outdoes its predecessor, it reaches a level of top-notch songwriting most groups never attain on a greatest hits compilation"—calling it "a musical map to the psyches of its performers."

Under the Radar wrote that Deadmalls and Nightfalls paints pictures, in vivid imagery of American scenery, life, and love, with not a single word misplaced in its poetic grace...an album meant to be combed through and listed to time and again, an album to bask in."

The album can be seen as the second installment in a trilogy of Matthew Milia's personal mythology set in Metro Detroit—bridging The Orion Songbook and Eternity of Dimming. Songs such as "Pontiac, the Nighbrink"—an intensely detailed depiction of Pontiac, Michigan—foreshadowed the zoomed-in specificity with which Eternity would explore further themes of memory and suburban space.

"Does Me In" was used in the documentary My Heart Is an Idiot which follows the love life of This American Life contributor Davy Rothbart.

Ryan Adams was a vocal fan of the album tweeting: ""Loving the new Frontier Ruckus! Great band...this is what I want to get back to. Those tunes go forever..."

The band performed several songs from the record for a Daytrotter session in 2010.

This was the first album by Frontier Ruckus to be accompanied by music videos, with a video shot for "Nerves of the Nightmind" in Los Angeles by Michael Fisk and a video for "The Upper Room" shot by David Meiklejohn in Portland, Maine.

Way Upstate and the Crippled Summer, pt. 2—an EP of five alternative country songs—was released on the fourth side of the Deadmalls and Nightfalls vinyl package in spring of 2011.

Track listing
All songs written by Matthew Milia
"Nerves of the Nightmind"
"Ontario"
"Springterror"
"Ringbearer"
"Silverfishes"
"The Upper Room"
"Does Me In"
"The Tower"
"Pontiac, the Nightbrink"
"How Could I Abandon?"
"I Do Need Saving"
"Pour Your Nighteyes"

Personnel
Frontier Ruckus
Matthew Milia – lead vocals, guitar, harmonica, pedal steel guitar, piano, bass guitar, harmonium
David Winston Jones – banjo, dobro, voice, mandolin, ebow
Zachary Nichols – trumpet, singing-saw, melodica, alto horn, euphonium, voice, harmonium
Ryan "Smalls" Etzcorn – drum kit, all percussions
Anna Burch – voice, bass guitar
Guest Musicians
Ryan Hay – piano and Hammond organ on tracks 1, 2, 4, 9
John Krohn – bass guitar on track 9
Jim Roll – fiddle on track 7

Production
Produced by Frontier Ruckus
Engineered and Mixed by Jim Roll
Mastered by Brent Lambert
Artwork and Design by Matthew Milia and Richard Maisano
Recorded and Mixed at Backseat Productions in Ann Arbor, Michigan during the winter of 2009–2010

References

External links 
 

2010 albums
Frontier Ruckus albums